The 2021 Spanish Grand Prix (officially known as the Formula 1 Aramco Gran Premio de España 2021) was a Formula One motor race which took place on 9 May 2021 at the Circuit de Barcelona-Catalunya in Montmeló, Spain. The race was the fourth round of the 2021 Formula One World Championship. The race was won by Mercedes driver Lewis Hamilton from pole position ahead of Red Bull's Max Verstappen and Hamilton's teammate Valtteri Bottas. The win allowed Hamilton to extend his Championship lead over Verstappen to 14 points.

Background

The race was the fourth round of the 2021 Formula One World Championship, the 61st edition of the Spanish Grand Prix, the 51st time it featured as a round of the World Championship, and the 31st time the Spanish Grand Prix took place at the Circuit de Barcelona-Catalunya. This was the first Formula One race held on this layout of the circuit, with turn 10 having been remodelled from a tight hairpin into a faster curve, to improve safety for drivers.

The drivers and teams were the same as the season entry list with no additional stand-in drivers for the race. Robert Kubica drove in the first practice session for Alfa Romeo Racing in place of Kimi Räikkönen, while Roy Nissany drove for Williams, replacing George Russell. Tyre supplier Pirelli brought the C1, C2 and C3 tyre compounds (designated hard, medium and soft respectively) for teams to use at the event. Heading into the race, Lewis Hamilton was leading the Drivers' Championship with 69 points, ahead of Max Verstappen on 61 and Lando Norris on 37. In the Constructors' Championship, Mercedes led on 101 points ahead of Red Bull on 83 and McLaren on 53.

Practice
As usual, the event had three practice sessions, each lasting one hour. The first practice session started at 11:30 local time (UTC+02:00) on 7 May and ended with Valtteri Bottas fastest in his Mercedes ahead of Red Bull driver Max Verstappen and Bottas' teammate Lewis Hamilton; Nikita Mazepin and Kubica both briefly lost control in minor incidents. The second practice session started at 15:00 local time and ended with Hamilton fastest ahead of Bottas and Ferrari driver Charles Leclerc. The third practice session, which started at 12:00 local time the following day, ended with Verstappen top, ahead of Hamilton and Leclerc.

Qualifying
Qualifying started at 15:00 local time (UTC+02:00) on 8 May. Lewis Hamilton set provisional pole position in his Q3 first flying lap. Hamilton was followed by Max Verstappen and Valtteri Bottas. None of the three drivers were able to improve their times in their subsequent laps, and Hamilton earned his 100th pole position.

Qualifying classification 

 Notes
  – Nikita Mazepin received a three-place grid penalty for impeding Lando Norris in Q1. The penalty was not in force as he started the race from the last position.

Race
The race started at 15:00 local time (UTC+02:00) and was held over 66 laps.

Race classification 

 Notes
  – Includes one point for fastest lap.

Championship standings after the race

Drivers' Championship standings

Constructors' Championship standings

 Note: Only the top five positions are included for both sets of standings.

See also 
 2021 Barcelona Formula 3 round

Notes

References

External links

Spanish Grand Prix
Spanish Grand Prix
Spanish Grand Prix
Grand Prix